Psi Ursae Majoris (Psi UMa, ψ Ursae Majoris, ψ UMa) is a star in the northern circumpolar constellation of Ursa Major. It has an apparent visual magnitude of +3.01, making it a third magnitude star and one of the brighter members of the constellation. This is sufficiently close that the magnitude of the star is only reduced by 0.05 due to extinction. In Chinese astronomy, Psi Ursae Majoris is called Tien Tsan or Ta Tsun, "Extremely Honorable". The name was possibly derived from the word 太尊, Pinyin: Tàizūn, meaning Royals, because this star stands alone as the only member of the Royals asterism within the Purple Forbidden enclosure (see Chinese constellation).

The spectrum of this star matches a stellar classification of K1 III, with the luminosity class of 'III' indicating this is an evolved giant star that has exhausted the supply of hydrogen at its core. As a consequence, it has expanded to around 20 times the radius of the Sun. It is radiating roughly 148 times the luminosity of the Sun from its enlarged outer envelope at an effective temperature of 4,520 K. At this heat, the star glows with the orange hue of a K-type star.

Psi Ursae Majoris is a member of the thin disk population of the Milky Way. The low inclination of its orbit means the star will only stray  from the galactic plane.

References

Ursae Majoris, Psi
Ursa Major (constellation)
K-type giants
Ursae Majoris, 52
054539
4335
096833
Durchmusterung objects